Ian Louis Kabes (born 14 May 1986 in Jayapura) is an Indonesian professional footballer who plays as a midfielder for and captains Liga 2 club Persipura Jayapura.

International careers
In 2007, he played to represent the Indonesia U-23, in 2007 SEA Games.
His international debut for Indonesia national team on 9 November 2007 against Syria in 1–4 losses. On 23 March 2013, after five years absent he performed again for the Indonesia national team against Saudi Arabia in the 2015 AFC Asian Cup qualification match.

Career statistics

International

Honours

Club honors
Persipura Jayapura
Liga Indonesia: 2005
Indonesia Super League: 2008–09, 2010–11
Indonesian Community Shield: 2009
Indonesian Inter Island Cup: 2011
Indonesia Soccer Championship A: 2016

References

External links
 
 

1986 births
Living people
Papuan people
People from Jayapura
Indonesian footballers
Indonesia international footballers
Association football midfielders
Indonesian Super League-winning players
Liga 1 (Indonesia) players
Persijap Jepara players
Persipura Jayapura players
Footballers at the 2006 Asian Games
Asian Games competitors for Indonesia
Papuan sportspeople
Sportspeople from Papua